Witch's milk or neonatal milk is milk secreted from the breasts of some newborn human infants of either sex. Neonatal milk secretion is considered a normal physiological occurrence and no treatment or testing is necessary. It is thought to be caused by a combination of the effects of maternal hormones before birth, prolactin, and growth hormone passed through breastfeeding and the postnatal pituitary and thyroid hormone surge in the infant.

Breast milk production occurs in about 5% of newborns and can persist for two months though breast buds can persist into childhood. Witch's milk is more likely to be secreted by infants born at full term, and not by prematurely born infants. The consistency of neonatal milk is estimated to be quite similar to maternal milk. Its production also may be caused by certain medications. In extremely rare cases neonatal mastitis may develop but it is unclear if it is related to neonatal milk secretion. Blood from the nipples is nearly always benign and frequently associated with duct ectasia; it should only be investigated when it is unilateral.

Cultural interpretations
In folklore, witch's milk was believed to be a source of nourishment for witches' familiar spirits. It was thought to be stolen from unwatched, sleeping infants.  In other cultures expressing milk from the infant's breasts is supposed to contribute to a good breast shape in adulthood.

In some cultures, the tradition of removing the milk ("milking") has been reported. This practice can prolong milk production and other problems cannot be ruled out.  While breastfeeding may also contribute to prolonged milk production and breast enlargement, temporary, or permanent weaning is not recommended.

See also
 Galactorrhea
 Gynecomastia
 Breastfeeding

References

Neonatology
Breast milk

de:Hexenmilch
ja:魔乳